Vatica scortechinii is a species of plant in the family Dipterocarpaceae. It is a tree endemic to Peninsular Malaysia. It is a critically endangered species threatened by habitat loss.

References

scortechinii
Endemic flora of Peninsular Malaysia
Trees of Peninsular Malaysia
Critically endangered flora of Asia
Taxonomy articles created by Polbot